Swap.com is an online thrift and consignment store offering pre-owned baby, kid's, maternity, men's and women's apparel and accessories. The company operates out of the Chicago suburb of Downers Grove, Illinois with a fulfillment center based in Rocky Mount, North Carolina.

Sellers price their own items and Swap.com handles the fulfillment and returns process for items sold.

Company
Swap.com is a platform for buying and selling used items. Sellers send their items to the Swap.com fulfillment center in Rocky Mount, North Carolina. After checking the items for quality, Swap.com individually packages holds the items in their warehouse for sale to a shopper on the platform. Swap.com charges a service fee of $1.50 + 30% of the selling price of each item, as well as a $11.99 per box inbound fee for processing and listing items that are sent to its logistics center.

The service started in late 2012 when Netcycler Inc. acquired Swaptree, operating on the Swap.com domain. The company closed Swaptree and launched what is now Swap.com in 2013 in 12,000 square foot facility in Addison, IL and relocated to a 67,000 square foot facility in Bolingbrook, IL in 2014, and in September 2015 relocated to a larger 360,000 square foot facility in Bolingbrook. 

In March, 2014, Swap.com launched a women's apparel service with 25,000 women's apparel and accessory items, and launched men's apparel in June 2016. The service is now the largest online consignment retailer with more than 2,000,000 items available for purchase.

In 2019, Swap.com reported an overall turnover of $15 Million.
The company is growing with an average quarterly growth rate of over 30 percent, which is expected to continue.

References

Non-store retailing
American companies established in 2012
Retail companies established in 2012
Internet properties established in 2012